Sakia Gunn (May 26, 1987 – May 11, 2003) was a 15-year-old African American lesbian who was murdered in what has been deemed  a hate crime in Newark, New Jersey. Richard McCullough, was charged with her death and sentenced to 20 years in prison. In 2008 a documentary was released about Gunn's murder, titled Dreams Deferred: The Sakia Gunn Film Project.

The murder
On the night of May 11, 2003, Gunn was returning from a night out in Greenwich Village, Manhattan, with her friends. While waiting for the #1 New Jersey Transit bus at the corner of Broad and Market Streets in downtown Newark, Gunn and her friends were propositioned by two men. The girls rejected their advances and declared themselves to be lesbians. The men attacked; Gunn fought back, and one of the men, Richard McCullough, stabbed her in the chest. Both men immediately fled the scene in their vehicle. After one of Gunn's friends flagged down a passing driver, she was taken to nearby University Hospital, where she died.

Sentencing
McCullough, who turned himself in to authorities several days later, was arrested in connection with the crime on May 16, 2003. In a plea bargain, the murder charges were dropped and, on March 3, 2005, McCullough pleaded guilty to aggravated manslaughter, aggravated assault, and bias intimidation, claiming, at one point, that Gunn died after she "ran into his knife". On April 21, 2005, he was sentenced to 20 years in prison.

Reaction
Gunn's death was the subject of a two-day series in the Washington Post in October 2004 by Anne Hull, who spent months reporting on the lives of young lesbians in Newark in the aftermath of the hate crime that killed their friend. The series was finalist for the Pulitzer Prize in Feature Writing in 2005.

Using the LexisNexis database, Kim Pearson, a professor at The College of New Jersey compared the media coverage of Sakia Gunn's death to the 1998 murder of Matthew Shepard: 659 stories were found in major newspapers about Shepard's murder, compared to 21 articles about Gunn's murder in the subsequent seven months. Pearson noted that not only were Shepard's attackers tried and convicted during this period, but that it took nearly that long for Gunn's attacker to be indicted.

Gunn's death sparked outrage from the city's gay and lesbian community. The community, in conjunction with GLAAD, rallied the mayor's office, requesting, among other things, the establishment of a gay and lesbian community center, that police officers to patrol the Newark Penn Station/Broad Street corridor 24-hours a day, the creation of an LGBT advisory council to the mayor, and that the school board be held accountable for the lack of concern and compassion when dealing with students at Westside High School (which Gunn attended) immediately following the murder. The Newark Pride Alliance, an LGBT advocacy group, was founded in the wake of Gunn's murder.

References

External links
 She didn't have to die by Keith Boykin
 Sakia Gunn Remembered by Keith Boykin
 Sakia Gunn's Killer Pleads Guilty
 The Sakia Gunn Film Project 
 The poem "The Other Black Man" by T. Miller references Sakia Gunn

1987 births
2003 deaths
2003 in LGBT history
2003 in New Jersey
2003 murders in the United States
20th-century American LGBT people
21st century in Newark, New Jersey
American victims of anti-LGBT hate crimes
Deaths by stabbing in the United States
Female murder victims
History of Newark, New Jersey
History of women in New Jersey
Lesbians
Lesbophobic violence
LGBT African Americans
LGBT history in New Jersey
LGBT people from New Jersey
May 2003 events in the United States
Murdered African-American people
People murdered in New Jersey